The 1944 Divisione Nazionale, better known as Campionato Alta Italia was a football championship organized by the Italian Social Republic and disputed in Northern and Central Italy in 1944 among Serie A and Serie B teams plus others.

The tournament was won by Spezia, and officially recognized as an "honorary" title by the Italian Football Federation (FIGC) only in 2002, following a long dispute. Following the decision of FIGC in 2002, Spezia is authorized by the Italian Federation to exhibit a tricolour badge on the official jerseys which is unique, being the only example of a permanent one in Italy. The badge has a different shape and size compared to the ordinary Scudetto.

Background 
Following the American conquest of Tunisia and later Sicily in 1943, Italy suffered heavy bombings by the Allied Powers. The consequent multiple damages on railways and streets imposed to the FIGC to plan a special mixed championship for the 1943–44 season, with three different regional groups to reduce the teams movements. However, at the eve of his dismissal, Benito Mussolini suspended all sport activities.

After Italy defeat in World War II, with the country divided by the "Gothic Line", the Italian Football Federation split in two: while the official FIGC remained in the south, under the rule by the Kingdom of Italy, the northern FIGC, ruled by the Italian Social Republic, moved its headquarters to Milan and organized a "campionato di divisione nazionale misto" (mixed national division championship). The so-called Campionato Alta Italia (High Italy Championship) was the only Italian championship organized on a more than regional basis: in Central and Southern Italy many regional championship were held. Originally, the Roman Championship won by Lazio was part of the Alta Italia qualifications, but the Liberation of Rome changed the plan.

The Spezia players had to obtain the status of Firefighters from the La Spezia local command in order to be able to play football games traveling to other cities, as freedom of movement was restricted during war time in Italy. Similarly, Torino Calcio players were allowed to move freely and play football carrying FIAT documents. In 1944 the Grande Torino, similarly to Spezia as VVFF, participated with the denomination Torino FIAT. 

In the northern FIGC's original plans, the winning team in the tournament would have been recognized as Champion of Italy; however; after the end of the championship, a statement from the northern Federation, following political pressure, announced that Spezia wouldn't be awarded the "Scudetto" title. Only in 2002 the Spezia title was officially recognised by FIGC as a decoration. 

Following the decision of FIGC in 2002, Spezia Calcio is authorized by the Italian Federation to exhibit a tricolour badge on the official jerseys which is unique, being the only example of a permanent one in Italy. The badge has a different shape and size compared to the ordinary Scudetto.

Qualifications

Piedmont and Liguria

Standings

Results

Lombardy

Standings

Results

Tie-breaker

Varese advanced to the semifinals

Veneto

Group A
Standings

Results

Group B

Results

Final round
Treviso and Vicenza withdrew before the start of the round

Both Venezia and Verona were admitted to the semifinals.

Venezia Giulia

Standings

Results

Emilia

Group A
Standings

Results

Group B
Standings

Results

Group C
Standings

Results

Group D
Standings

Results

Tuscany

Standings

Semifinals

Group A (Piedmont and Lombardy)

Standings

Results

Group B (Veneto and Venezia Giulia)

Verona withdrew before the start of the semifinals.

Standings

Results

Group C (Emilia)

Round 1

Group A
Standings

Results

Group B
Standings

Results

Round 2

VV.FF. Spezia didn't play the semifinals, due to the retirement of Lucchese (the semifinalist of Tuscany), and they were directly admitted to the final.

Final round

Standings

Results

References and sources
Fabrizio Calzia and Paolo Rabajoli, Lo Scudetto per sempre – I Vigili del fuoco della Spezia Campioni d’Italia 1944, Sagep e Il Secolo XIX

Footnotes

External links
  - All results on RSSSF Website.

Italian Football Championship seasons
Italy
Italy
1
1